Bindusagar Lake is located in the right side of the Talabazar road leading from Kedargouri Chowk to Lingaraja Temple, Old Town, Bhubaneswar. This road is also known as Bindusagar Road. It is now under the care and maintenance of Lingaraja Temple Administration. The tank is enclosed within a masonry embankment made of dressed laterite blocks. It is the largest water body of Bhubaneswar. All the rituals of Lord Lingarajaa are closely associated with this lake.

Tradition and legends 

According to the local tradition, Shiva and Parvati after their marriage came to Varanasi. But with the passage of time, Varanasi became a populated area. Lord Siva chose Ekamrakshetra for meditation in disguise. This place was having a single huge mango tree surrounded by jungle. Even it was unknown to Parvati. This place is also known as gupta kashi hidden Varanasi. With the reference from lord Bramha, Devi Parvati learned about this place and came to Ekamra-Kshetra to search her Lord Shiva. Also she noticed that thousands of cows are going under the huge mango tree and automatically milking a place. She understood that her Lord Shiva is there. So she took care of the cows as a milkmaid. (Gopaluni Temple is There inside Lingaraj Temple Complex and this is one out of the Astmurti) The place from which the cows were coming is known as Gosahasreswara or Gosagaresvar. Devi Parvati in the milkmaid get-up was looking too attractive. It was also noticed by the two demons of this locality, known as Kirti and Vasa. They proposed Parvati to marry. But Parvati killed the two demons by pressing them into the ground with her feet. That particular place became famous as Devi Padahara. After killing the demons Parvati became tired and took rest at a place called Bhabani Shankar Temple. Parvati felt very thirsty and to quench her thirst lord Siva struck his trident at this place, out of which a spring came out. The water was then sanctified by the waters of all rivers, streams and ultimately took the shape of a large water body. Which is today known as Bindusagar.

History 

 Approximate date: 7th / 8th century A.D.
 Source of Information: Because the temples of both formative phase to final phase are found on its embankments, the tank precedes them.

Physical description 

 Surrounding: The tank has embankments on all the four sides.
 Orientation: Bathing ghats are provided with steps made of large size laterite blocks in all sides.
At the centre of the tank there is a pidha shrine what the locals call as Jagati. During the Chandan Yatra, held in the month of May, Lord Lingaraja visits the shrine by navigating through a boat. Chandan Yatra is the main function of the tank associated with Lord Lingaraja.
  Decorative features: The tank is surrounded by a series of shrines. Eastern embankment: Dwarabasini, Ananta Vasudeva, Brahma, Hanuman etc. Western Embankments: Lingaraja rest house, Nilakanthesvara, Akhadachandi, Paschimesvara and Markandesvara Temple.Northern embankments: Uttaresvara Temple precinct, Emara Matha, Southern embankment: Swarnadhiswara Bhabanisankar, Sari deula, Mohini temple, Akhandalamani / Panchanana etc.
 Building material: Dressed laterite blocks.
 Construction techniques: Dry masonry
 Special features, if any: It is fed by a natural spring from the underground. The excess and waste water is discharged through an outlet channel in the southeastern wall, beneath the Talabazar road near Dalmiya Dharmasala. The outlet channel measures  in height and in width. As a result, the water level of the tank remains constant throughout the year. Despite such provisions made in the past to keep the tank water clean and fresh now the water is one of the most polluted among the water bodies in the city, which need special care and attention.

References 

 Debala Mitra, Bhubaneswar, New Delhi, 1958, P. 60.
 L. S.S. O’ Malley, Bengal District Gazetter Puri, Calcutta 1908, P. 243.
 M.M. Ganguly, Orissa and Her Remains, Calcutta, 1912, P. 269.
 N. K. Sahu (Ed), A History of Orissa, Vol. II, Delhi, 1980, P. 270.
 R. P. Mohapatra, Archaeology in Orissa, Vol.I, Delhi, 1986, P. 82.
 R. L. Mitra. The Antiquities of Orissa, Vol. II, Calcutta, 1963, P. 118-121.

Temple tanks in Odisha
Tourist attractions in Bhubaneswar
Buildings and structures in Bhubaneswar